The Indiana Mr. Basketball honor recognizes the top high school basketball player in the state of Indiana. The award is presented annually by The Indianapolis Star.  The first Indiana Mr. Basketball was George Crowe of Franklin High School in 1939. The Indiana Mr. Basketball award is the oldest such award in the nation, predating the second oldest by over a decade; California would be the next state with such an award in 1950.

Award winners

Schools with multiple winners

* – Indicates a tie in which both recipients attended the same school

Colleges with multiple winners

See also
Indiana Miss Basketball award

References

External links
Indiana's Mr. Basketball
Indiana Basketball Hall of Fame
Indianapolis Monthly story on award winners
Pictures of all former Mr. Basketballs

Mr. and Miss Basketball awards
High school basketball in Indiana
Awards established in 1939
1939 establishments in Indiana
Lists of people from Indiana
Mr. Basketball